Hecyra is a genus of longhorn beetles of the subfamily Lamiinae.

 Hecyra marmorata Breuning, 1972
 Hecyra obscurator (Fabricius, 1801)
 Hecyra tenebrioides Fåhraeus, 1872
 Hecyra terrea (Bertoloni, 1849)

References

Crossotini